Rick Pluimers (born 7 December 2000) is a Dutch professional racing cyclist, who currently rides for UCI ProTeam .

Major results

2017
 4th Ronde van Gelderland
2018
 1st Menen–Kemmel–Menen
 3rd Grand Prix Bob Jungels
 6th Overall Grand Prix Général Patton
 6th Omloop van Borsele
 8th Overall Grand Prix Rüebliland
 10th Nokere Koerse Juniors
2020
 7th Ster van Zwolle
 9th Antwerp Port Epic
2021
 2nd Liège–Bastogne–Liège Espoirs
 5th Overall Tour du Pays de Montbéliard
 6th Paris–Troyes
 7th Overall Orlen Nations Grand Prix
2022
 1st Prologue (TTT) Tour de l'Avenir
 6th Visit Friesland Elfsteden Race
 10th Ronde van Drenthe

References

External links

2000 births
Living people
Dutch male cyclists
Cyclists from Overijssel